Bangladesh Agricultural Research Institute (BARI) is an autonomous organization under the Ministry of agriculture, that conducts research on all crops except rice, jute, sugarcane, and tea for which there are separate institutes.

History
Bangladesh Agricultural Research Institute traces its origins to Dhaka farm which was established in 1908. Bangladesh Agricultural Research Institute was established in 1976 as an autonomous research institute. The research compound of the central station is spread over 176 hectares of land of which 126 hectares are experiment fields. The institute has established six regional research stations in six regions of Bangladesh to develop new technologies. These research stations are located at Ishwardi, Jamalpur, Jessore, Hathazari, Rahmatpur, and Akbarpur. It also has 28 research stations including three hill research stations (Khagrachari, Ramgarh and Raikhali). Besides these, BARI has seven crop research centers, four of which are at the central research station in Joydebpur.

Constituent agricultural colleges 
 Bangladesh Agricultural Institute
 Patuakhali Science and Technology University
 Hajee Mohammad Danesh Science & Technology University

Corps research centre 
 Tuber Crops Research Centre
 Wheat Research Centre
 Horticultural Research Centre
 Pulse Research Centre
 Oil Crops Research Centre
 Spice Research Centre

See also
 Bangabandhu Sheikh Mujibur Rahman Agricultural University
 Bangladesh Rice Research Institute
 Bangladesh Agricultural University
 List of agricultural universities and colleges
 BARI High School
Mango Research Station
Central Cattle Breeding and Dairy Farm

References

External links 
 Bangladesh Agricultural Research Institute

Agricultural universities and colleges in Bangladesh
Educational institutions established in 1976
1976 establishments in Bangladesh
Recipients of the Independence Day Award
Organisations based in Gazipur
Agricultural research institutes
Agriculture research institutes in Bangladesh